Palliyulla Kariat Abdulla Koya (P K Abdulla Koya) (born 13 February 1957) is an NRI entrepreneur from Abu Dhabi and Garshom Award winner. He is the Founder and Chairman of the AKNOVEL Group.
He is the man who brought about a revolutionary change in Rubber stamp manufacturing industry in India. Abdulla Koya has helped over 50,000 people across country to gain self-employment.

Early life
Abdulla Koya was born in Calicut, a well known coastal town and an important trade center in North Kerala. He is the third son of the late Kasmi Koya and Beevi. He was forced to find out small jobs as daily wages to support his family. He worked hard in several sectors for earning the minimum to help his family. This structure is the initial training of his carrier. In 1978, Abdulla Koya has arrived in United Arab Emirates as Labour.

Personal life
Abdulla Koya is married to Nazeema and has four children – Noora, Majidha, Ahamed Zayed and Shymah.

Career history
Abdulla Koya has established his name in the stamp field with his branded products Sun Stamper  with Japanese Technology during 1998 by providing innovative and world class products to the common business segment by associating with international manufactures and ADDPRINT  stepped into the forefront of Stamp business within a short time. Koya entered the supply of telecommunication equipment, in the telecom and Power Project field through MELTRAX Electro Mechanical & communication system. His Other notable diversification  are  M/S National Tile Works, Beta Granite (P) Ltd, Walayar steels, Musou Micro Flash Foams Pvt Ltd., Crest Wood.

Koya is also the Director of CARE (The Cancer and Allied Ailments Research) Foundation.

Philanthropy
Abdulla Koya is very closely involved in charitable and humanitarian activities in India, especially in Kerala. Currently, he is the Vice Chairman of MVR Cancer Centre & Research Institute. He has done various philanthropic activities across India.

Awards
 Garshom International Award 2018
 Sheikh Zayed International Excellence award 2017
 Asianet Global Business Excellence award 2017

References

External links 
 meltrax.com
 addprint.net
 addprintrubberstamps-United Arab Emirates
 addprintrubberstamps-Australia
 addprint-India
 sunstamper.com

Garshom Awardees
Indian expatriates in the United Arab Emirates
1957 births
Living people
People from Abu Dhabi
Emirati people of Malayali descent
Businesspeople from Kozhikode
Businesspeople from Kerala